Fairfax Historic District may refer to:

Fairfax Historic District (Valley, Alabama), listed on the National Register of Historic Places (NRHP)
Beverly Fairfax Historic District, Los Angeles, California, NRHP-listed in Los Angeles
Parkfairfax Historic District, Alexandria, Virginia, NRHP-listed
City of Fairfax Historic District, Fairfax, Virginia, NRHP-listed